Megachile minutuloides is a species of bee in the family Megachilidae. It was described by Alfken in 1936.

References

Minutuloides
Insects described in 1936